The Hope Center Coalition, previously the Coalition of Hope, was a political and electoral coalition in Colombia composed of political parties and social movements of the centre. According to them, they will work under four programmatic guidelines, which are to regain confidence in democracy, put the economy at the service of citizens, take care of biodiversity and protect citizens and territories.

References

2021 establishments in Colombia
Political parties established in 2021
Political party alliances in Colombia
Political parties disestablished in 2022
2022 disestablishments in Colombia